Aleksandr Sergeyevich Sokolov is a Russian politician and former Minister of Culture and Mass Communication for then-President Vladimir Putin's government. He was nominated to the post by the then-Prime Minister, Mikhail Fradkov, and held it from 9 March 2004 to 12 May 2008.

Sokolov was born on 8 August 1949 in Leningrad (now Saint Peterburg).  He completed his undergraduate degree at the Moscow Conservatory as a musicologist, and his attained his master's degree from the Conservatory's Department of Music Theory.   He holds a Ph.D. in Musicology (1982) and the degree of Grand Doctor in Art (1992). He is also a member of Russian Composers Union and is a distinguished professor in many universities in Europe, Japan, and South Korea.

Since 1979 Sokolov has taught at the Moscow Conservatory, being appointed a full professor in 1993.  He teaches music analysis and has chaired the Department of Music Theory since 1996. Between 1992 and 2001 he was the Conservatory's Vice-Rector in Scientific Affairs. From 2001 to 2004 Sokolov held the position of Rector of the Moscow Conservatory, leaving to take up his governmental position.  In June 2009 he was re-elected as rector.

Sokolov has received many public and governmental honors, including the Honored Art Worker of Russian Federation (1999) and the Laureate of National Prize of Russia (2005).
He is an author of several musicological books and articles on music composition. Among them his monograph: "Introduction of the 20th Century Music Composition" (Moscow, 2004).

Sokolov is married to Larisa Sokolova and they have one daughter.

References

External links 

 Страница на сайте Правительства РФ
 
 Меценаты столетия
 Время новостей: N°185, 06 октября 2005 Marina Karaseva. Edit-PR. "Vremya novostei" Daily. 06.10.2005. No. 185. P. 10
 Известия.Ру: "Любой в консерватории улыбнется, услышав, что Соколов - человек Швыдкого" Is it true that Sokolov is Shvydkoy's Man Friday? Anyone at the conservatory just smiles on hearing such a question. Discussion with Prof. Karaseva in "Izvestia" daily newspaper,17.03.2004. P. 9. 2004
 Chicken soup из курочки Рябы Marina Karaseva. Chicken Soup from the Golden Eggs-Producing Hen. Who will be rector of Moscow Conservatory. "Nezavisimaya Gazeta" daily newspaper. (62), 16.02.2001. P. 9
 Luke Harding No Paris trip for Russia's kissing policemen Artwork inspired by Banksy is among 16 banned from show by culture minister. October 12, 2007 The Guardian.
 Marina Karaseva.Sots Art starts and wins. "Kultura" Weekly Newspaper, No.41 (7602) Sept.18 - 24, 2007. P. 4.
 Russian Composers Union (Soyuz kompozitorov Rossii). Reference Book. Moscow, "Kompozitor Publishing House", 2004. P.101.
 The Moscow Conservatory. Information Booklet. Second Edition. Moscow, 2001. P. 36. .
 Moscow Conservatoire. Moscow, 1994. PP.31. .
 Moscow Conservatory: Traditions of Music Education, Art, and Science 1866–2006. Moscow, "Moskovskaya Konservatoriya" Publishing House, 2006. P. 86–87.
 Profile.ru "Cultural Duet" - Larisa Sokolov interview
 Биография Александра Соколова

Russian music theorists
Russian musicologists
1949 births
Living people
Politicians from Saint Petersburg
Moscow Conservatory alumni
Honorary Members of the Russian Academy of Arts
Recipients of the Order of Honour (Russia)
Recipients of the Order of the Rising Sun, 2nd class
Culture ministers of Russia
State Prize of the Russian Federation laureates
Academic staff of Moscow Conservatory